Tönning (German; Low German Tünn, Tönn or Tönnen; Danish: Tønning; North Frisian: Taning) is a town in the district of Nordfriesland in the German state of Schleswig-Holstein.

History
Tönning was destroyed in the Burchardi flood in 1634.  During the Great Northern War, (1700–1721), Tönning was besieged twice.

Geography
It is located on the northern bank of the Eider river, approximately eight kilometers away from its mouth at the North Sea. Tönning has a population of some 5,000 people.

Transport
Tönning is connected by a regional train with Sankt Peter-Ording to the West, and Husum to the North-East. Tönning is also served by several bus routes.

See also
Eiderstedt peninsula
Eider Barrage

Personalities

Honorary citizen 

 Friedrich Wilhelm Selck (1821–1911), councilor of commerce, honorary citizen since 1899
 Friedrich von Esmarch (1823–1908), German physician and the founder of the civilian Samaritan system in Germany, honorary citizen since 1897; there is a memorial statue dedicated to him in the castle park.

Sons and daughters of the city 

 Jürgen Ovens (1623–1678), painter, portraitist
 Johann Friedrich Alberti (1642–1710), composer, organist
 Fanny Suenssen (1832–1918), Danish novelist and short story writer
 Kurt Thomas (1904–1973), composer, music educator and chorus leader

Connected to Tönning 

 Hinrich Braren (1751–1826), captain, pilot and navigation instructor, died in Tönning. He wrote the first German-language textbook of shipping.

References

Towns in Schleswig-Holstein
Nordfriesland
Populated coastal places in Germany (North Sea)